Mirsky's Worst of the Web (WOTW) was a website devoted to showcasing what David Mirsky, a former Harvard Lampoon writer, considered "the worst web sites ever". WOTW was the first well-trafficked site to feature "bad" web sites for entertainment purposes.  His commentary was short on constructive criticism and long on insulting the web site layout, content and graphics, and sometimes the web designers themselves.

Website
WOTW was created by Mirsky in January 1995, in response to sites such as Glenn Davis's Cool Site of the Day. The format was simple: three days a week, Mirsky would select about three new sites, providing links and one-sentence comments that were "acidic, addictive, and insanely funny". For some time, at least, this was a paid job, supported by web service provider Volant.

The site's tagline was "If it isn't Mirsky's then it isn't  the worst!"

An article about the site gives some of its flavor:

According to several interviews, Mirsky expected WOTW to lead to money-making opportunities, and grew frustrated with maintaining it because it never did.  On November 1, 1996, Mirsky stopped producing WOTW.

See also
 The Useless Pages

References

Further reading
 —warns web designers of the punishment for bad design: ending up in Mirsky's 
 Glenn McDonald On Mirsky, the website, and Mirsky's days at the Harvard Lampoon
 Interview with Mirsky

External links
 
 Mirsky's current site

Defunct websites
American comedy websites
Internet properties established in 1995
Lists of worsts
Ironic and humorous awards